Jung Eun-hea (born 27 September 1989) is a South Korean sport shooter.

She won the silver medal in women's 10 metre air rifle at the 2018 Asian Games. She participated at the 2018 ISSF World Shooting Championships.

References

External links

Living people
1989 births
South Korean female sport shooters
ISSF rifle shooters
Shooters at the 2018 Asian Games
Asian Games medalists in shooting
Medalists at the 2018 Asian Games
Asian Games silver medalists for South Korea
Sportspeople from Incheon
20th-century South Korean women
21st-century South Korean women